The Samahang Manibela Mananakay at Nagkaisang Terminal ng Transportasyon (SMMITT), simply known as Manibela is a public transport organization in the Philippines. It claims to have 50,000 drivers and operators as members as of March 2022.

The group has opposed the implementation of phaseout for traditional jeepneys under the Philippine government's Public Utility Vehicle Modernization Program. They initiated a nationwide transport strike in 2023 against the policy.

For the 2022 Philippine presidential election, they endorsed the campaign of Leni Robredo. They made a failed bid to participate in the 2022 House of Representatives election and to win a seat in the legislature as a partylist organization. Their candidacy failed to receive accreditation from the Commission on Elections.

External links

References

Transportation organizations based in the Philippines
Trade unions in the Philippines
Activism in the Philippines